LOU LOU was a Canadian women's magazine launched in 2004. The magazine is headquartered in Toronto. It was printed by  Rogers Media on a monthly basis, in English and French editions. The magazine closed in 2016.

References

External links
 LOU LOU website (English portal)

2004 establishments in Canada
2016 disestablishments in Canada
Defunct magazines published in Canada
English-language magazines
French-language magazines published in Canada
Magazines established in 2004
Magazines disestablished in 2016
Magazines published in Toronto
Monthly magazines published in Canada
Rogers Communications magazines
Women's magazines published in Canada
Eight times annually magazines